Mastax rugiceps is a species of beetle in the family Carabidae with restricted distribution in Myanmar.

References

Mastax rugiceps
Beetles of Asia
Beetles described in 1892